is a Japanese handball player for Mie Violet’Iris and the Japanese national team.

She represented Japan at the 2013 World Women's Handball Championship in Serbia, where the Japanese placed 14th.

References

1991 births
Living people
Japanese female handball players
Handball players at the 2014 Asian Games
Handball players at the 2018 Asian Games
Asian Games silver medalists for Japan
Asian Games bronze medalists for Japan
Asian Games medalists in handball
Medalists at the 2014 Asian Games
Medalists at the 2018 Asian Games
Handball players at the 2020 Summer Olympics
21st-century Japanese women
20th-century Japanese women